The 2019–20 Toronto Raptors season was the 25th season of the franchise in the National Basketball Association (NBA). The Raptors entered the season for the first time in franchise history as the defending NBA champions, following their NBA Finals win over the previous two-time NBA champion Golden State Warriors in six games. The Raptors had the second best team defensive rating in the NBA.

The Raptors lost 2019 NBA Finals MVP Kawhi Leonard in the offseason as he signed a 3-year, $103M max contract with the Los Angeles Clippers becoming the first Finals MVP to leave the season they won a championship. The Raptors showed they were still championship contenders with Leonard gone, and went 53–19 in a eventual 72-game season on pace for 60 plus wins. They were led by Pascal Siakam being an All-NBA and All Star starter, Kyle Lowry earning his 6th All Star selection, Serge Ibaka and Fred VanVleet having their offensive best year of their careers, the impact of Marc Gasol and OG Anunoby on both ends, the success of undrafted rookie Terence Davis who was selected to the 2020 NBA All-Rookie Team, and Nick Nurse winning the 2020 NBA Coach of the Year Award.

The Raptors finished the season with the second best record in the league only behind the Milwaukee Bucks  like the 2018–19 NBA season. On March 5, 2020, the Raptors became the second team to clinch a playoff spot by defeating the Golden State Warriors. The season was suspended by the league officials following the games of March 11, after it was reported that Rudy Gobert tested positive for COVID-19.

The Raptors faced the Brooklyn Nets in the first round of the playoffs where they swept the Nets in four games. They would go on to lose to the Boston Celtics in seven games in the Eastern Conference Semifinals. Raptors Franchise Icon Kyle Lowry made his 6th straight All Star appearance. Pascal Siakam made his first All NBA Team as he was selected to the 2020 All NBA Second Team. Siakam was selected as an All Star starter in his first NBA All Star Game in 2020.

Draft

The Raptors only held a second round draft pick. In July 2018 they had traded their first round pick and DeMar DeRozan to the San Antonio Spurs to obtain Kawhi Leonard and Danny Green.

Roster

Standings

Division

Conference

Record vs opponents

(* game decided in overtime)

Game log

Preseason 

|- style="background:#cfc;"
| 1
| October 8
| Houston
| 
| Pascal Siakam (24)
| Pascal Siakam (11)
| Davis, VanVleet (5)
| Saitama Super Arena20,413
| 1–0
|- style="background:#fcc;"
| 2
| October 10
| @ Houston
| 
| Norman Powell (22)
| Serge Ibaka (8)
| Fred VanVleet (10)
| Saitama Super Arena20,413
| 1–1
|- style="background:#fcc;"
| 3
| October 13
| Chicago
| 
| OG Anunoby (15)
| Dewan Hernandez (11)
| Anunoby, Davis, Johnson (4)
| Scotiabank Arena16,438
| 1–2
|- style="background:#cfc;"
| 4
| October 18
| @ Brooklyn
| 
| OG Anunoby (18)
| Marc Gasol (9)
| Fred VanVleet (8)
| Barclays Center12,380
| 2–2

Restart scrimmage

|- style="background:#cfc;"
| 1
| July 24
| Houston
| 
| Serge Ibaka (18)
| Rondae Hollis-Jefferson (8)
| Fred VanVleet (7)
| The Arena
| 1–0
|- style="background:#cfc;"
| 2
| July 26
| Portland
| 
| Serge Ibaka (19)
| Chris Boucher (7)
| Anunoby, Hollis-Jefferson, Lowry (4)
| Visa Athletic Center
| 2–0
|- style="background:#fcc;"
| 3
| July 28
| @ Phoenix
| 
| Pascal Siakam (17)
| Gasol, Ibaka (9)
| Kyle Lowry (7)
| The Arena
| 2–1

Regular season

|- style="background:#cfc;"
| 1
| October 22
| New Orleans
| 
| Siakam, VanVleet (34)
| Pascal Siakam (18)
| Fred VanVleet (7)
| Scotiabank Arena20,787
| 1–0
|- style="background:#fcc;"
| 2
| October 25
| @ Boston
| 
| Pascal Siakam (33)
| Anunoby, Ibaka, Siakam (8)
| Kyle Lowry (7)
| TD Garden18,624
| 1–1
|- style="background:#cfc;"
| 3
| October 26
| @ Chicago
| 
| Pascal Siakam (19)
| Marc Gasol (10)
| Kyle Lowry (8)
| United Center21,498
| 2–1
|- style="background:#cfc;"
| 4
| October 28
| Orlando
| 
| Kyle Lowry (26)
| Gasol, Ibaka (10)
| Lowry, VanVleet (6)
| Scotiabank Arena19,800
| 3–1
|- style="background:#cfc;"
| 5
| October 30
| Detroit
| 
| Pascal Siakam (30)
| OG Anunoby (8)
| Fred VanVleet (11)
| Scotiabank Arena19,800
| 4–1

|- style="background:#fcc;"
| 6
| November 2
| @ Milwaukee
| 
| Kyle Lowry (36)
| Marc Gasol (12)
| Fred VanVleet (7)
| Fiserv Forum17,637
| 4–2
|- style="background:#cfc;"
| 7
| November 6
| Sacramento
| 
| Kyle Lowry (24)
| Pascal Siakam (13)
| Kyle Lowry (6)
| Scotiabank Arena19,800
| 5–2
|- style="background:#cfc;"
| 8
| November 8
| @ New Orleans
| 
| Pascal Siakam (44)
| Pascal Siakam (10)
| Fred VanVleet (11)
| Smoothie King Center16,337
| 6–2
|- style="background:#cfc;"
| 9
| November 10
| @ L. A. Lakers
| 
| Pascal Siakam (24)
| Pascal Siakam (11)
| Fred VanVleet (10)
| Staples Center18,997
| 7–2
|- style="background:#fcc;"
| 10
| November 11
| @ L. A. Clippers
| 
| Pascal Siakam (16)
| Pascal Siakam (10)
| Fred VanVleet (8)
| Staples Center19,068
| 7–3
|- style="background:#cfc;"
| 11
| November 13
| @ Portland
| 
| Pascal Siakam (36)
| Rondae Hollis-Jefferson (11)
| Fred VanVleet (7)
| Moda Center19,544
| 8–3
|- style="background:#fcc;"
| 12
| November 16
| @ Dallas
| 
| Norman Powell (26)
| Marc Gasol (9)
| Siakam, VanVleet (7)
| American Airlines Center19,926
| 8–4
|- style="background:#cfc;"
| 13
| November 18
| Charlotte
| 
| OG Anunoby (24)
| Chris Boucher (11)
| Marc Gasol (9)
| Scotiabank Arena19,800
| 9–4
|- style="background:#cfc;"
| 14
| November 20
| Orlando
| 
| Fred VanVleet (24)
| Boucher, Siakam (11)
| Fred VanVleet (7)
| Scotiabank Arena19,800
| 10–4
|- style="background:#cfc;"
| 15
| November 23
| @ Atlanta
| 
| Pascal Siakam (34)
| Rondae Hollis-Jefferson (9)
| Fred VanVleet (9)
| State Farm Arena16,931
| 11–4
|- style="background:#cfc;"
| 16
| November 25
| Philadelphia
| 
| Pascal Siakam (25)
| Rondae Hollis-Jefferson (10)
| Marc Gasol (9)
| Scotiabank Arena19,800
| 12–4
|- style="background:#cfc;"
| 17
| November 27
| New York
| 
| Pascal Siakam (31)
| Anunoby, Boucher (12)
| Terence Davis (5)
| Scotiabank Arena19,800
| 13–4
|- style="background:#cfc;"
| 18
| November 29
| @ Orlando
| 
| Norman Powell (33)
| Pascal Siakam (13)
| Pascal Siakam (5)
| Amway Center17,014
| 14–4

|- style="background:#cfc;"
| 19
| December 1
| Utah
| 
| Pascal Siakam (35)
| Rondae Hollis-Jefferson (6)
| Fred VanVleet (11)
| Scotiabank Arena18,132
| 15–4
|- style="background:#fcc;"
| 20
| December 3
| Miami
| 
| Norman Powell (23)
| Pascal Siakam (12)
| Kyle Lowry (11)
| Scotiabank Arena19,800
| 15–5
|- style="background:#fcc;"
| 21
| December 5
| Houston
| 
| Pascal Siakam (24)
| Pascal Siakam (9)
| Kyle Lowry (8)
| Scotiabank Arena19,800
| 15–6
|- style="background:#fcc;"
| 22
| December 8
| @ Philadelphia
| 
| Kyle Lowry (26)
| OG Anunoby (10)
| Kyle Lowry (5)
| Wells Fargo Center20,313
| 15–7
|- style="background:#cfc;"
| 23
| December 9
| @ Chicago
| 
| Pascal Siakam (22)
| Serge Ibaka (14)
| Kyle Lowry (7)
| United Center14,775
| 16–7
|- style="background:#fcc;"
| 24
| December 11
| L. A. Clippers
| 
| Pascal Siakam (24)
| Marc Gasol (11)
| Gasol, Lowry (6)
| Scotiabank Arena20,144
| 16–8
|- style="background:#cfc;"
| 25
| December 14
| Brooklyn
| 
| Pascal Siakam (30)
| Marc Gasol (15)
| Kyle Lowry (6)
| Scotiabank Arena19,800
| 17–8
|- style="background:#cfc;"
| 26
| December 16
| Cleveland
| 
| Pascal Siakam (33)
| OG Anunoby (9)
| Kyle Lowry (11)
| Scotiabank Arena19,800
| 18–8
|- style="background:#cfc;"
| 27
| December 18
| @ Detroit
| 
| Pascal Siakam (26) 
| Serge Ibaka (13)
| Kyle Lowry (10) 
| Little Caesars Arena15,319
| 19–8
|- style="background:#cfc;"
| 28
| December 20
| Washington
| 
| Kyle Lowry (26) 
| Serge Ibaka (10)
| Kyle Lowry (9) 
| Scotiabank Arena19,800
| 20–8
|- style="background:#cfc;"
| 29
| December 22
| Dallas
| 
| Kyle Lowry (32) 
| Rondae Hollis-Jefferson (9)
| Kyle Lowry (10)
| Scotiabank Arena19,800
| 21–8
|- style="background:#fcc;"
| 30
| December 23
| @ Indiana
| 
| Kyle Lowry (30) 
| OG Anunoby (12)
| Fred VanVleet (11)
| Bankers Life Fieldhouse17,164
| 21–9
|- style="background:#fcc;"
| 31
| December 25
| Boston
| 
| Fred VanVleet (27)
| Serge Ibaka (8)
| Kyle Lowry (8) 
| Scotiabank Arena19,800
| 21–10
|- style="background:#cfc;"
| 32
| December 28
| @ Boston
| 
| Kyle Lowry (30) 
| Serge Ibaka (10)
| Patrick McCaw (8) 
| TD Garden19,156
| 22–10
|- style="background:#fcc;"
| 33
| December 29
| Oklahoma City
| 
| Lowry, VanVleet (20)
| Serge Ibaka (14)
| Fred VanVleet (8)
| Scotiabank Arena19,800
| 22–11
|- style="background:#cfc;"
| 34
| December 31
| Cleveland
| 
| Kyle Lowry (24) 
| Serge Ibaka (10)
| Kyle Lowry (8) 
| Scotiabank Arena19,800
| 23–11

|- style="background:#fcc;"
| 35
| January 2
| @ Miami
| 
| Serge Ibaka (19)
| OG Anunoby (12)
| Kyle Lowry (8) 
| American Airlines Arena19,939
| 23–12
|- style="background:#cfc;"
| 36
| January 4
| @ Brooklyn
| 
| Fred VanVleet (29)
| Serge Ibaka (12)
| Fred VanVleet (11)
| Barclays Center17,732
| 24–12
|- style="background:#fcc;"
| 37
| January 7
| Portland
| 
| Kyle Lowry (24) 
| Serge Ibaka (11)
| Kyle Lowry (10) 
| Scotiabank Arena19,800
| 24–13
|- style="background:#cfc;"
| 38
| January 8
| @ Charlotte
| 
| Davis, Ibaka (23)
| Davis, Ibaka (11)
| Patrick McCaw (11)
| Spectrum Center13,965
| 25–13
|- style="background:#fcc;"
| 39
| January 12
| San Antonio
| 
| Serge Ibaka (21)
| Serge Ibaka (14)
| Kyle Lowry (15)
| Scotiabank Arena19,800
| 25–14
|- style="background:#cfc;"
| 40
| January 15
| @ Oklahoma City
| 
| Norman Powell (23)
| Terence Davis (7)
| Kyle Lowry (8)
| Chesapeake Energy Arena18,203
| 26–14
|- style="background:#cfc;"
| 41
| January 17
| Washington
| 
| Norman Powell (28)
| Serge Ibaka (8)
| Kyle Lowry (8)
| Scotiabank Arena19,800
| 27–14
|- style="background:#cfc;"
| 42
| January 18
| @ Minnesota
| 
| Fred VanVleet (29)
| Kyle Lowry (7)
| Gasol, Hollis-Jefferson, Powell (4)
| Target Center16,520
| 28–14
|- style="background:#cfc;"
| 43
| January 20
| @ Atlanta
| 
| Norman Powell (27)
| Rondae Hollis-Jefferson (10)
| Kyle Lowry (7)
| State Farm Arena17,300
| 29–14
|- style="background:#cfc;"
| 44
| January 22
| Philadelphia
| 
| Fred VanVleet (22)
| Pascal Siakam (15)
| Fred VanVleet (8)
| Scotiabank Arena19,800
| 30–14
|- style="background:#cfc;"
| 45
| January 24
| @ New York
| 
| Kyle Lowry (26)
| Marc Gasol (9)
| Fred VanVleet (9)
| Madison Square Garden18,883
| 31–14
|- style="background:#cfc;"
| 46
| January 26
| @ San Antonio
| 
| Pascal Siakam (35)
| Marc Gasol (12)
| Fred VanVleet (7)
| AT&T Center18,354
| 32–14
|- style="background:#cfc;"
| 47
| January 28
| Atlanta
| 
| Ibaka, Siakam (24)
| Serge Ibaka (10)
| Kyle Lowry (11)
| Scotiabank Arena19,800
| 33–14
|- style="background:#cfc;"
| 48
| January 30
| @ Cleveland
| 
| Serge Ibaka (26)
| Fred VanVleet (7)
| Fred VanVleet (12)
| Rocket Mortgage FieldHouse17,695
| 34–14
|- style="background:#cfc;"
| 49
| January 31
| @ Detroit
| 
| Pascal Siakam (30)
| Fred VanVleet (8)
| Fred VanVleet (9)
| Little Caesars Arena17,356
| 35–14

|- style="background:#cfc;"
| 50
| February 2
| Chicago
| 
| Terence Davis (31)
| Pascal Siakam (9)
| Fred VanVleet (8)
| Scotiabank Arena19,800
| 36–14
|- style="background:#cfc;"
| 51
| February 5
| Indiana
| 
| Kyle Lowry (32)
| Pascal Siakam (9)
| Kyle Lowry (10)
| Scotiabank Arena19,800
| 37–14
|- style="background:#cfc;"
| 52
| February 7
| @ Indiana
| 
| Serge Ibaka (22)
| Serge Ibaka (10)
| Kyle Lowry (11)
| Bankers Life Fieldhouse17,028
| 38–14
|- style="background:#cfc;"
| 53
| February 8
| Brooklyn
| 
| Fred VanVleet (29)
| Terence Davis (8)
| Fred VanVleet (6)
| Scotiabank Arena19,800
| 39–14
|- style="background:#cfc;"
| 54
| February 10
| Minnesota
| 
| Pascal Siakam (34)
| OG Anunoby (12)
| Kyle Lowry (11)
| Scotiabank Arena19,800
| 40–14
|- style="background:#fcc;"
| 55
| February 12
| @ Brooklyn
| 
| Serge Ibaka (28)
| Kyle Lowry (11)
| Kyle Lowry (12)
| Barclays Center15,823
| 40–15
|- style="background:#cfc;"
| 56
| February 21
| Phoenix
| 
| Pascal Siakam (37)
| Pascal Siakam (12)
| Kyle Lowry (10)
| Scotiabank Arena19,800
| 41–15
|- style="background:#cfc;"
| 57
| February 23
| Indiana
| 
| Pascal Siakam (21)
| Serge Ibaka (15)
| Kyle Lowry (11)
| Scotiabank Arena19,800
| 42–15
|- style="background:#fcc;"
| 58
| February 25
| Milwaukee
| 
| Pascal Siakam (22)
| Rondae Hollis-Jefferson (8)
| Kyle Lowry (6)
| Scotiabank Arena19,993
| 42–16
|- style="background:#fcc;"
| 59
| February 28
| Charlotte
| 
| Pascal Siakam (24)
| Anunoby, Hollis-Jefferson (9)
| Kyle Lowry (6)
| Scotiabank Arena19,800
| 42–17

|- style="background:#fcc;"
| 60
| March 1
| @ Denver
| 
| OG Anunoby (32)
| Anunoby, Siakam (7)
| Kyle Lowry (8)
| Pepsi Center19,777
| 42–18
|- style="background:#cfc;"
| 61
| March 3
| @ Phoenix
| 
| Pascal Siakam (33)
| Chris Boucher (15)
| Kyle Lowry (6)
| Talking Stick Resort Arena15,553
| 43–18
|- style="background:#cfc;"
| 62
| March 5
| @ Golden State
| 
| Norman Powell (37)
| Serge Ibaka (13)
| Kyle Lowry (10)
| Chase Center18,064
| 44–18
|- style="background:#cfc;"
| 63
| March 8
| @ Sacramento
| 
| Norman Powell (31)
| Serge Ibaka (10)
| Kyle Lowry (8)
| Golden 1 Center16,449
| 45–18
|- style="background:#cfc;"
| 64
| March 9
| @ Utah
| 
| Ibaka, Siakam (27)
| Serge Ibaka (13)
| Pascal Siakam (8)
| Vivint Smart Home Arena18,306
| 46–18

|- style="background:#;"
| 65
| March 14
| Detroit
| 
|
|
|
| Scotiabank Arena
|
|- style="background:#;"
| 66
| March 16
| Golden State
| 
|
|
|
| Scotiabank Arena
|
|- style="background:#;"
| 67
| March 18
| @ Philadelphia
| 
|
|
|
| Wells Fargo Center
|
|- style="background:#;"
| 68
| March 20
| Boston
| 
|
|
|
| Scotiabank Arena
|
|- style="background:#;"
| 69
| March 22
| Denver
| 
|
|
|
| Scotiabank Arena
|
|- style="background:#;"
| 70
| March 24
| LA Lakers
| 
|
|
|
| Scotiabank Arena
|
|- style="background:#;"
| 71
| March 25
| @ New York
| 
|
|
|
| Madison Square Garden
|
|- style="background:#;"
| 72
| March 28
| @ Memphis
| 
|
|
|
| FedExForum
|
|- style="background:#;"
| 73
| March 30
| Memphis
| 
|
|
|
| Scotiabank Arena
|
|- style="background:#;"
| 74
| April 1
| @ Milwaukee
| 
|
|
|
| Fiserv Forum
|
|- style="background:#;"
| 75
| April 3
| Milwaukee
| 
|
|
|
| Scotiabank Arena
|
|- style="background:#;"
| 76
| April 5
| @ Houston
| 
|
|
|
| Toyota Center
|
|- style="background:#;"
| 77
| April 7
| @ Washington
| 
|
|
|
| Capital One Arena
|
|- style="background:#;"
| 78
| April 8
| @ Charlotte
| 
|
|
|
| Spectrum Center
|
|- style="background:#;"
| 79
| April 10
| Atlanta
| 
|
|
|
| Scotiabank Arena
|
|- style="background:#;"
| 80
| April 12
| New York
| 
|
|
|
| Scotiabank Arena
|
|- style="background:#;"
| 81
| April 14
| @ Miami
| 
|
|
|
| American Airlines Arena
|
|- style="background:#;"
| 82
| April 15
| @ Orlando
| 
|
|
|
| Amway Center
|

|- style="background:#cfc;"
| 65
| August 1
| L. A. Lakers
| 
| Kyle Lowry (33)
| Kyle Lowry (14)
| Fred VanVleet (11)
| The ArenaNo In-Person Attendance
| 47–18
|- style="background:#cfc;"
| 66
| August 3
| @ Miami
| 
| Fred VanVleet (36)
| Kyle Lowry (8)
| Lowry, Powell (5) 
| HP Field HouseNo In-Person Attendance
| 48–18
|- style="background:#cfc;"
| 67
| August 5
| @ Orlando
| 
| Fred VanVleet (21)
| Ibaka, Lowry (9)
| Lowry, VanVleet (10)
| Visa Athletic CenterNo In-Person Attendance
| 49–18
|- style="background:#fcc;"
| 68
| August 7
| Boston
| 
| Fred VanVleet (13) 
| Marc Gasol (9)
| Gasol, VanVleet (4) 
| The ArenaNo In-Person Attendance
| 49–19
|- style="background:#cfc;"
| 69
| August 9
| Memphis
| 
| Pascal Siakam (26)
| Serge Ibaka (12)
| Kyle Lowry (8)
| Visa Athletic CenterNo In-Person Attendance
| 50–19
|- style="background:#cfc;"
| 70
| August 10
| @ Milwaukee
| 
| Chris Boucher (25)
| Chris Boucher (11)
| Marc Gasol (8)
| HP Field HouseNo In-Person Attendance
| 51–19
|- style="background:#cfc;"
| 71
| August 12
| @ Philadelphia
| 
| Boucher, Lowry (19)
| Boucher, Siakam (9)
| Fred VanVleet (6)
| HP Field HouseNo In-Person Attendance
| 52–19
|- style="background:#cfc;"
| 72
| August 14
| Denver
| 
| Stanley Johnson (23)
| Chris Boucher (9)
| Stanley Johnson (6)
| HP Field HouseNo In-Person Attendance
| 53–19

Playoffs
see also 2020 NBA playoffs

|- style="background:#cfc;"
| 1
| August 17
| Brooklyn
| 
| Fred VanVleet (30)
| Pascal Siakam (11)
| Fred VanVleet (11)
| AdventHealth ArenaNo in-person attendance
| 1–0
|- style="background:#cfc;"
| 2
| August 19
| Brooklyn
| 
| Powell, VanVleet (24)
| Kyle Lowry (9)
| Fred VanVleet (10)
| HP Field HouseNo in-person attendance
| 2–0
|- style="background:#cfc;"
| 3
| August 21
| @ Brooklyn
| 
| Pascal Siakam (26)
| Serge Ibaka (13)
| Kyle Lowry (7)
| HP Field HouseNo in-person attendance
| 3–0
|- style="background:#cfc;"
| 4
| August 23
| @ Brooklyn
| 
| Norman Powell (29)
| Serge Ibaka (15)
| Pascal Siakam (10)
| HP Field HouseNo in-person attendance
| 4–0

|- style="background:#fcc;"
| 1
| August 30
| Boston
| 
| Kyle Lowry (17)
| Serge Ibaka (9)
| Lowry, VanVleet (8)
| HP Field HouseNo in-person attendance
| 0–1
|- style="background:#fcc;"
| 2
| September 1
| Boston
| 
| OG Anunoby (20)
| Serge Ibaka (9)
| Lowry, VanVleet (7)
| HP Field HouseNo in-person attendance
| 0–2
|- style="background:#cfc;"
| 3
| September 3
| @ Boston
| 
| Kyle Lowry (31)
| OG Anunoby (10)
| Kyle Lowry (8)
| HP Field HouseNo in-person attendance
| 1–2
|- style="background:#cfc;"
| 4
| September 5
| @ Boston
| 
| Pascal Siakam (23)
| Lowry, Siakam (11)
| Kyle Lowry (7)
| HP Field HouseNo in-person attendance
| 2–2
|- style="background:#fcc;"
| 5
| September 7
| Boston
| 
| Fred VanVleet (18)
| OG Anunoby (7)
| Lowry, VanVleet (5)
| HP Field HouseNo in-person attendance
| 2–3
|- style="background:#cfc;"
| 6
| September 9
| @ Boston
| 
| Kyle Lowry (33)
| OG Anunoby (13)
| Fred VanVleet (7)
| HP Field HouseNo in-person attendance
| 3–3
|- style="background:#fcc;"
| 7
| September 11
| Boston
| 
| Fred VanVleet (20)
| Pascal Siakam (11)
| Fred VanVleet (6)
| AdventHealth ArenaNo in-person attendance
| 3–4

Player statistics

Regular season
Final

|-
| style="text-align:left;"| || 69 || 68 || 29.9 || .505 || .390 || .706 || 5.3 || 1.6 || 1.4 || .7 || 10.6
|-
| style="text-align:left;"| || 62 || 0 || 13.2 || .472 || .322 || .784 || 4.5 || .4 || .4 || 1.0 || 6.6
|-
| style="text-align:left;"| || 19 || 0 || 7.1 || .361 || .200 || .800 || 1.4 || .4 || .2 || .1 || 1.9
|-
| style="text-align:left;"| || 72 || 4 || 16.8 || .456 || .388 || .864 || 3.3 || 1.6 || .5 || .2 || 7.5
|-
| style="text-align:left;"| || 44 || 43 || 26.4 || .427 || .385 || .735 || 6.3 || 3.4 || .8 || .9 || 7.5
|-
| style="text-align:left;"| || 6 || 0 || 4.7 || .357 || .500 || .600 || 2.3 || .5 || .2 || .0 || 2.3
|-
| style="text-align:left;"| || 60 || 6 || 18.7 || .471 || .130 || .734 || 4.7 || 1.8 || .8 || .4 || 7.0
|-
| style="text-align:left;"| || 55 || 27 || 27.0 || .512 || .385 || .718 || 8.2 || 1.4 || .5 || .8 || 15.4
|-
| style="text-align:left;"| || 25 || 0 || 6.0 || .373 || .292 || .563 || 1.5 || .8 || .2 || .2 || 2.4
|-
| style="text-align:left;"| || 58 || 58 || 36.2 || .416 || .352 || .857 || 5.0 || 7.5 || 1.4 || .4 || 19.4
|-
| style="text-align:left;"| || 37 || 12 || 24.5 || .414 || .324 || .722 || 2.3 || 2.1 || 1.1 || 0.1 || 4.6
|-
| style="text-align:left;"| || 28 || 1 || 5.8 || .414 || .364 || .375 || .6 || .4 || .2 || .1 || 1.3
|-
| style="text-align:left;"| || 52 || 26 || 28.4 || .495 || .399 || .843 || 3.7 || 1.8 || 1.2 || .4 || 16.0
|-
| style="text-align:left;"| || 60 || 60 || 35.2 || .453 || .359 || .792 || 7.3 || 3.5 || 1.0 || .9 || 22.9
|-
| style="text-align:left;"| || 41 || 1 || 10.7 || .487 || .475 || .750 || 1.5 || .5 || .2 || .0 || 4.9
|-
| style="text-align:left;"| || 54 || 54 || 35.7 || .413 || .390 || .848 || 3.8 || 6.6 || 1.9 || .3 || 17.6
|-
| style="text-align:left;"| || 8 || 0 || 8.8 || .526 || .444 || .778 || 1.9 || .6 || .4 || .1 || 3.9

Transactions

Re-signed

Additions

Subtractions

Awards

References

Toronto Raptors seasons
Toronto Raptors
Toronto Raptors
Toronto Raptors
Tor